Woe is me is an archaic idiom expressing sorrow or despair. It is an allusion to Psalm 120. 

"Woe is me" also may refer to:

TV
 "Woe Is Me", episode of 1980s television series My Little Pony

Music
"Woe Is Me", anthem by Thomas Tomkins 
 Woe, Is Me (band), from Atlanta, Georgia
 Woe Is Me, album by Johnny Griffin and Dennis Irwin  (Jazz Hour, 1988)

Songs

 "Woe Is Me", from musical The 25th Annual Putnam County Spelling Bee
 "Woe Is Me" (1956), The Cadillacs, Esther Navarro
 "Woe Is Me" (1963), Helen Shapiro, Sharon Sheeley, Jackie De Shannon	

 "Woe Is Me" (1965), Ray Kimble and the Flaming Embers
 "Woe Is Me" (1973), Woe Is Me", Bobby Lee Trammell
 "Woe Is Me" (1979), Spike Milligan and Ed Welch
 "Oh Woe Is Me" (1982), Joan Jett and the Blackhearts, on I Love Rock 'n' Roll (album)
 "Whoa Is Me" (2010), by Down With Webster
 "Woe Is Meee" (2017), by Ghostpoet from Dark Days + Canapés